World Institute of Scientology Enterprises (WISE) is a Church of Scientology organization headquartered in Los Angeles, California. It states that it is an "international membership organization whose members use both L. Ron Hubbard management technology and embrace the responsibilities and ethical standards of WISE membership."

History
Hubbard said about the early Churches of Scientology:  "They are not business and so fail when they try to operate like one". He then began creating a new system of organizing these churches with the stated purpose of "Disseminating Scientology to the world"; this new system was modified continually until about 1980. In the late '60s, a project began compiling his notes into hard bound volumes that later became known as the Organization Executive Course, or OEC. Originally intended as a training program for church executives (hence the name),  Hubbard later made them available to all church staff and stated that all staff should train on them.

However, the OEC was stated to work for any kind of organization. Businesses not connected to the church wishing to improve their own success reportedly began hiring trained church staff in the '70s, causing problems within the church. In the 1980s, Hubbard created WISE with the intention of giving any non-church related organization a means to train their own staff, so that Scientology churches and missions could train their staff without fear of losing them to other groups. 

WISE was officially incorporated in 1979.

Organization
WISE headquarters are located in Los Angeles, California, 6331 Hollywood Blvd, in the Hollywood Guaranty Building. The corporate executives of WISE belong to the Sea Org of the Church of Scientology.
Hubbard College of Administration International, which provides a "Degree program for an Associate of Applied Science Degree of Management and Administration", is located at 320 North Vermont Avenue, Los Angeles, California.
WISE regional offices, which are at Church of Scientology locations, coordinate the local level Charter Committees.
Charter Committees of established members in local areas provide guidance and dispute mediation between WISE members instead of using the civil courts.
Hubbard Management Consultants are WISE members licensed to sell services, seminars, training and courses based on Admin Tech and to encourage their clients to become WISE members. Consultants are encouraged to compete in the "WISE Consultant Expansion Game" with weekly standings. WISE consultants include "MasterTech Computer Products", Sterling Management Systems, Survival Strategies Inc., Management Success and David Singer Enterprises.

Membership

Membership in WISE means that the owner(s) of the firm have embraced Hubbard's administrative ideas such as management by statistics and the Org board and have agreed to abide by a certain Code of Ethics which includes arbitration by a WISE mediator of any disputes with another WISE member. That is the basic company membership. If the firm also wants to train its employees in the Hubbard administrative technology using WISE materials then they become a higher-level member by paying a pre-determined amount of money to WISE. Some employees and prospective employees have objected to this formal training in that it is something that is also a part of Scientology and a number have filed discrimination lawsuits with mixed results.

WISE Members include e-Republic, which publishes Government Technology and Converge magazines and coordinates the Center for Digital Government.  Other affiliated firms include various "alternative health" centers including "The Natural Health Centre" in Redondo Beach, CA which is owned and operated by Dr. Grace Syn. WISE ANZO members include Gallop Solutions based in Sydney, Australia.

Lawsuits
A number of firms use the WISE administrative technology in their practices and there have been a number of civil suits and discrimination cases brought by employees objecting to the material with mixed results:
 In 2009, a former dental assistant reported a dentist to the Oregon Bureau of Labor and Industries for religious discrimination after she felt pressured to attend a Scientology conference. In 2012, the dentist paid nearly $348,000 to settle the allegation. 
 In 2008, two former employees of Diskeeper, a WISE member, sued the company for being dismissed for refusing to participate in Scientology training courses.
 In 2006, the Equal Employment Opportunity Commission filed a federal lawsuit against dentist K. Mike Dossett of Plano, Texas, on behalf of Dossett's former receptionist, Jessica Uretsky. The suit alleges that Uretsky was pressured to study Scientology during mandatory meetings on her own time, and was told to "increase business by concentrating on her phone to make it ring".
 In 2005, dentist Daniel Stewart and his Smile Savers Dentistry in Baltimore, Maryland, were sued by former employee Tammy Bright. She accused her employer of religious discrimination for failure to adapt her religious beliefs to Scientology. Devora Lindeman, Stewart's attorney who is also a Scientologist herself, denied the allegations and said Bright was fired for "poor performance."
 In 2003, three former employees of Aurora, Ohio, dentist C. Aydin Cabi asserted in court that Dr. Cabi dismissed them from their jobs for their refusal to take part in Sterling Management's Scientology-based seminars.
 In 2002, The U.S. Equal Employment Opportunity Commission  filed a lawsuit on behalf of former employees of dentist Juan Villareal and Harlingen Family Dentistry in Harlingen, Texas, who refused to attend Scientology training courses.
 In 1998, dentist Roger N. Carlsten was sued for religious discrimination in the workplace by former employee Susan Morgan, who alleged in court that she was fired for refusing to take a Scientology-filled Hubbard Administrative Technology "statistics" course. A Rhode Island Superior Court jury, however, cleared the dentist of the charges.
 In 1994, Christina M. Goudeau of Baton Rouge, Louisiana, filed suit against Landmark Dental Care. Goudeau reported she was fired because she was expected to join the Church of Scientology, and to use Scientology practices and terminology in the office.
 In 1992, two former assistants of dentist Lyn V. Bates filed suit in Canton, Ohio, claiming they "were continually, against their will, subjected to religious recruitment, proselytizing and brainwashing by defendants in fervent attempts to convert them to the Scientology cult."

Notes

References

External links

 WISE
 Sterling Management
 Hubbard College of Administration site
 WISE Charter Committees

Scientology organizations

Religious corporations
Religious organizations established in 1979
Organizations based in Los Angeles